Lord Henry George Charles Gordon-Lennox PC (2 November 1821 – 29 August 1886), known as Lord Henry Lennox, was a British Conservative politician who sat in the House of Commons from 1846 to 1885 and was a close friend of Benjamin Disraeli.

Background and education
Lennox was the third son of Charles Gordon-Lennox, 5th Duke of Richmond, and Lady Caroline, daughter of Field Marshal Henry Paget, 1st Marquess of Anglesey. He was the brother of Charles Gordon-Lennox, 6th Duke of Richmond, Lord Alexander Gordon-Lennox and Lord George Gordon-Lennox. He was educated at The Prebendal School, Chichester, then University of Oxford.

Political career
Lennox entered the House of Commons in 1846 as Member of Parliament for Chichester, in Sussex. He represented this constituency until 1885, when he stood for Partick, but was defeated.

Lennox held office in every Conservative government between 1852 and 1876. He was a Junior Lord of the Treasury in 1852 and between 1858 and 1859 in the first two short-lived governments of the Earl of Derby before becoming First Secretary of the Admiralty in 1866 in Derby's last government, a post he held until 1868, the last year under the premiership of his close friend Benjamin Disraeli. According to John F. Beeler in British naval policy in the Gladstone-Disraeli era, 1866-1880, Lennox acted as a spy to the then Chancellor of the Exchequer, Disraeli, informing him of the intentions of leading admirals.

He served again under Disraeli as First Commissioner of Works from 1874 to 1876 and was admitted to the Privy Council in 1874. He was forced to resign as First Commissioner of Works after revelations in the case of Twycross v Grant regarding the Lisbon Tramways swindle, of which company he was a director.

Personal life
Lennox married Amelia Susannah (née Smith, then Brooman), widow of John White, in 1883. They had no children. He died in August 1886, aged 64. Lady Henry Lennox died in February 1903. John White was the uncle of another peer, Lord Overtoun, while lady Amelia was the great-grandmother of 1950s MP Richard Brooman-White.

References

External links 
 

1821 births
1886 deaths
People educated at The Prebendal School
Conservative Party (UK) MPs for English constituencies
Lennox, Lord Henry
UK MPs 1841–1847
UK MPs 1847–1852
UK MPs 1852–1857
UK MPs 1857–1859
UK MPs 1859–1865
UK MPs 1865–1868
UK MPs 1868–1874
UK MPs 1874–1880
UK MPs 1880–1885
Members of the Privy Council of the United Kingdom